Charles Benham Larrabee (19 May 1926 – 29 March 2008) was an American lawyer and justice on the New Mexico Supreme Court.

Born in Cedar Rapids to a father in the fledgling commercial airline industry, Larrabee grew up in various places and finished his education at The British Schools of Montevideo in Uruguay. Following World War II, he studied at the University of Iowa and subsequently the University of New Mexico School of Law.

He was appointed to the state supreme court by Governor Garrey Carruthers in 1989 but later resigned as he did not wish to go through with campaigning for a permanent seat.

References

1926 births
2008 deaths
Justices of the New Mexico Supreme Court
University of New Mexico School of Law alumni
People educated at The British Schools of Montevideo